Ronnie Ray Campbell (February 16, 1954 – December 13, 2022) was an American politician who served as a member of the Virginia House of Delegates, first elected in a special election in 2018. Campbell represented the 24th district comprising Rockbridge and Bath Counties, parts of Amherst and Augusta Counties, and the independent cities of Lexington and Buena Vista.

Early life and career
Campbell was born, on February 16, 1954, in Waynesboro, Virginia. He received a bachelor's degree from East Tennessee State University in 1976, majoring in criminal science. After that, he became a Virginia State Police officer, working in Northern Virginia.

Political career 
Campbell spent ten years on the Rockbridge County School Board. In 2012, he was elected to the Rockbridge County Board of Supervisors.

In November 2018, 24th district state delegate Ben Cline was elected to the United States House of Representatives, triggering a special election for his state house seat. The local Republican party held a firehouse primary to choose their nominee. Campbell won the primary by a one-vote margin, defeating Amherst County Supervisor Jimmy Ayers and two other candidates. In the December 2018 special election, Campbell defeated lawyer and activist Christian Worth  by a 59% to 40% margin.

Campbell was sworn into office on January 2, 2019, a week before the 2019 legislative session started.

2020–21 United States election protests 

Campbell was one of three GOP delegates in Virginia that sent a letter to Vice President Pence asking him to throw out the state's election results, which gave Joe Biden the win and Virginia's 13 electoral votes. The letter included two co-signers, Del. Mark Cole (R-Fauquier) and Del. Dave LaRock (R-Loudoun), requesting “a stay of any designation of Presidential Electors from our state until such time as a comprehensive forensic audit of the November 3, 2020, election has taken place to determine the actual winner.”

Personal life and death
Campbell died of cancer on December 13, 2022, at the age of 68. Campbell was succeeded in the House of Delegates by his wife Ellen, who won a January 2023 special election. They had five children.

References

External links
Ronnie Campbell at the Virginia Public Access Project

1954 births
2022 deaths
21st-century American politicians
American state police officers
County supervisors in Virginia
East Tennessee State University alumni
People from Rockbridge County, Virginia
People from Waynesboro, Virginia
Place of death missing
Republican Party members of the Virginia House of Delegates
School board members in Virginia